Clusia croatii is a species of flowering plant in the family Clusiaceae. It is found in Costa Rica and Panama, with one population in N Colombia. It is threatened by habitat loss.

References

croatii
Flora of Colombia
Flora of Panama
Vulnerable plants
Taxonomy articles created by Polbot